Oceanwide Center is a mixed-use skyscraper complex on hold in the South of Market neighborhood of San Francisco, California, consisting of two towers.

Design

The taller tower, located at 50 First Street, is expected to rise  and contain 34 stories of office space below 19 floors with approximately 111 residential units.  The base of the tower includes a six-story tall, outdoor "urban room" of public open space.  The tower will feature diagonal, exterior bracing and taper towards the top, reminiscent of the John Hancock Center in Chicago.  If completed as proposed, the  tower would become San Francisco's second-tallest building after Salesforce Tower, surpassing the long time record-holder, the Transamerica Pyramid.

The shorter tower, at 512 Mission Street, is planned to climb  and will contain the 169-room Waldorf Astoria San Francisco hotel on the first 21 floors and approximately 154 residential units on the upper 33 floors.

History

The parcels around 50 First Street were upzoned as part of the Transit Center District Plan approved in 2012 in conjunction with the new Transbay Transit Center.  The parcels were originally assembled by developer David Choo and a plan was floated in 2007 for towers as tall as  designed by Renzo Piano.  Choo was eventually forced to sell the property during the 2008 financial crisis.

TMG and Northwood hired Foster + Partners and Heller Manus Architects to re-design the project. In 2015, Beijing-based Oceanwide Holdings acquired the property for US$296 million. A groundbreaking ceremony for the buildings was held on December 8, 2016.

Construction on the shorter of the two towers was suspended in 2019 due to economic conditions. Subsequently, the construction on the second, taller tower was also halted in 2020 due to the COVID-19 pandemic and had not resumed construction as of April 2021.

See also

 List of tallest buildings in San Francisco

External links
Oceanwide Center - Foster + Partners

References

China Oceanwide Holdings Group
Skyscrapers in San Francisco
Residential condominiums in the United States
South of Market, San Francisco
Proposed skyscrapers in the United States